Ingmar Bergman was a Swedish screenwriter and film director. Between 1944 and 2003 he directed 49 feature-length films, being 45 narrative films and 4 documentaries, as well as many short films. He also served as writer and producer for many other films.

In addition to his work in film, Bergman was playwright and theatre director, and he simultaneously worked extensively in theatre throughout his film career.

Films

Narrative

Documentary

Other film work

Narrative

Documentary

References 
General
 
 

Specific

See also 
 List of stage productions directed by Ingmar Bergman

External links
 

Bergman, Ingmar
Ingmar Bergman